Clinical neuroscience is a branch of neuroscience that focuses on the scientific study of fundamental mechanisms that underlie diseases and disorders of the brain and central nervous system. It seeks to develop new ways of conceptualizing and diagnosing such disorders and ultimately of developing novel treatments.

A  clinical neuroscientist is a scientist who has specialized knowledge in the field. Not all clinicians are clinical neuroscientists. Clinicians and scientists -including psychiatrists, neurologists, clinical psychologists, neuroscientists, and other specialists—use basic research findings from neuroscience in general and clinical neuroscience in particular to develop diagnostic methods and ways to prevent and treat neurobiological disorders. Such disorders include addiction, Alzheimer's disease, amyotrophic lateral sclerosis, anxiety disorders, attention deficit hyperactivity disorder, autism, bipolar disorder, brain tumors, depression, Down syndrome, dyslexia, epilepsy, Huntington's disease, multiple sclerosis, neurological AIDS, neurological trauma, pain, obsessive-compulsive disorder, Parkinson's disease, schizophrenia, sleep disorders, stroke and Tourette syndrome.

While neurology, neurosurgery and psychiatry are the main medical specialties that use neuroscientific information, other specialties such as cognitive neuroscience, neuroradiology, neuropathology, ophthalmology, otorhinolaryngology, anesthesiology and rehabilitation medicine can contribute to the discipline. Integration of the neuroscience perspective alongside other traditions like psychotherapy, social psychiatry or social psychology will become increasingly important.

One Mind for Research

The "One Mind for Research" forum was a convention held in Boston, Massachusetts on May 23–25, 2011 that produced the blueprint document A Ten-Year Plan for Neuroscience: From Molecules to Brain Health. Leading neuroscience researchers and practitioners in the United States contributed to the creation of this document, in which 17 key areas of opportunities are listed under the Clinical Neuroscience section. These include the following:

 Rethinking curricula to break down intellectual silos
 Training translational neuroscientists and clinical investigators
 Investigating biomarkers 
 Improving psychiatric diagnosis
 Developing a “Framingham Study of Brain Disorders” (i.e. longitudinal cohort for central nervous system disease)
 Identifying developmental risk factors and producing effective interventions
 Discovering new treatments for pain, including neuropathic pain
 Treating disorders of neural signaling and pathological synchrony
 Treating disorders of immunity or inflammation
 Treating metabolic and mitochondrial disorders
 Developing new treatments for depression
 Treating addictive disorders
 Improving treatment of schizophrenia
 Preventing and treating cerebrovascular disease
 Achieving personalized medicine
 Understanding shared mechanisms of neurodegeneration
 Advancing anesthesia

In particular, it advocates for better integrated and scientifically driven curricula for practitioners, and it recommends that such curricula be shared among neurologists, psychiatrists, psychologists, neurosurgeons and neuroradiologists.

Given the various ethical, legal and societal implications for healthcare practitioners arising from advances in neuroscience, the University of Pennsylvania inaugurated the Penn Conference on Clinical Neuroscience and Society in July 2011.

See also
 Behavioral neurology
 Neuropsychiatry
 Neuropsychology
 Society for Neuroscience
 Cognitive neuroscience

References

Clinical neuroscience